Recordings of the St John Passion are shown as a sortable table of selected notable recordings of Johann Sebastian Bach's  St John Passion, BWV 245. The selection is taken from the 241 recordings listed on bach-cantatas as of 2015.

History 
The work was first recorded by symphonic choirs and orchestras. From the late 1960s, historically informed performances (HIP) tried to adhere more to the sounds of the composer's lifetime, who typically wrote for boys choirs and for comparatively small orchestras of Baroque instruments, often now called "period instruments". Some scholars believe that Bach used only one singer for a vocal part in the choral movements, termed "one voice per part" (OVPP). On some of these recordings, the solo singer is reinforced in choral movements with a larger orchestra by a ripieno singer (OVPP+R).

Table of selected recordings 

The sortable listing is taken mostly from the selection provided by Aryeh Oron on the Bach-Cantatas website.

The information lists for one recording typically:
 Conductor / choir / orchestra, sometimes several choirs
 Soloists in the order Evangelist (tenor), Vox Christi (Voice of Jesus, bass), soprano, alto, tenor (if the tenor arias are performed by a different tenor than the evangelist), bass (if the bass parts are performed by a different bass than the voice of Jesus).
 Label
 Year of the recording
 Choir type
 Large choirs (red background): Bach (choir dedicated to Bach's music, founded in the mid of the 20th century), Boys (choir of all male voices), Radio (choir of a broadcaster), Symphony (choir related to a symphony orchestra)
 Medium-size choirs, such as Chamber choir, Chorale (choir dedicated mostly to church music)
 One voice per part (green background): OVPP or OVPP+R (with ripienists reinforcing the soloists in some chorale movements)
 Orch. type (orchestra type)
 Large orchestras (red background): Bach (orchestra dedicated to Bach's music, founded in the mid of the 20th century), Radio (symphony orchestra of a broadcaster), Symphony
 Chamber orchestra
 Orchestra on period instruments (green background)

References

Sources 
 St. John Passion Commentary, musical examples, list of recordings, and other information on bach-cantatas

Discographies of compositions by J. S. Bach